Cuencas Mineras is a comarca in Aragon, Spain. It is located in Teruel Province, in the mountainous area of the Sistema Ibérico.
The administrative capital is Utrillas, with 3,346 inhabitants the largest town of the comarca, but the historical and cultural center is Montalbán. 

This comarca owes its name to certain mining zones in its area. Some municipalities of Cuencas Mineras are part of the historical region of Lower Aragon. The main mountain range in the area is Sierra de San Just.

Municipalities
Alcaine 
Aliaga 
Anadón 
Blesa 
Cañizar del Olivar 
Castel de Cabra 
Cortes de Aragón 
Cuevas de Almudén 
Escucha 
Fuenferrada 
Hinojosa de Jarque 
La Hoz de la Vieja 
Huesa del Común 
Jarque de la Val 
Josa 
Maicas 
Martín del Río 
Mezquita de Jarque 
Montalbán 
Muniesa 
Obón 
Palomar de Arroyos 
Plou 
Salcedillo 
Segura de los Baños 
Torre de las Arcas 
Utrillas 
Villanueva del Rebollar de la Sierra 
Vivel del Río Martín 
La Zoma

See also
Lower Aragon

References

External links

 Cuencas Mineras - Gran Enciclopedia Aragonesa
 Comarcas de Aragón - Cuencas Mineras
Cuencas Mineras  - Tourism 

Comarcas of Aragon
Geography of the Province of Teruel